Astrid Maria Elisabet "Lisette" Schulman (née Stolpe; 13 June 1951, Karlskoga – 19 February 2015) was a Swedish television host and politician. 

She was born to Sven Stolpe, an author and Karin Stolpe (née von Euler-Chelpin), a daughter of German-born Swedish Nobel Prize laureate in Chemistry Hans von Euler-Chelpin and botanist, chemist and researcher Astrid Cleve and sister of Nobel Prize laureate in Physiology or Medicine Ulf von Euler.  She was also the great-granddaughter of Per Teodor Cleve.  

She was the widow of television producer Allan Schulman. She was the mother of media personalities Alex Schulman and Calle Schulman. She also had a third child, Niklas Schulman.  

Schulman was television host of 1970s shows such as Sveriges Magasin, with Lasse Holmqvist, and in Pappa vet bäst?, with Stellan Sundahl on Sveriges Television. At the end of the 1990s, she was a politician for Kristdemokraterna in Varberg Municipality.

She participated in the first episode of Swedish television show På spåret together with actor Evert Lindkvist and archaeologist Anna-Lena Segestam in 1987.

References

Swedish television hosts
20th-century Swedish women politicians
People from Karlskoga Municipality
Place of death missing
1951 births
2015 deaths
Local politicians in Sweden
Swedish women television presenters